Fāṭima bint Ḥuzām al-Kilābīyya al-ʿAlawīyya (died 683/684 or 69 A.H. 688/689), better known as ʾUmm al-Banīn (meaning "Mother of the Sons"), was a wife of Ali. She was from the tribe of Banu Kilab a branch of Qays Ailan tribes.
Umm al-Banin married Ali ibn Abi Talib after the death of his first wife Fatima, daughter of the Islamic prophet, Muhammad. Umm al-Banin and Ali had four sons, of whom the eldest was Abbas ibn Ali, the commander of Husayn ibn Ali's forces at the Battle of Karbala. All of Umm al-Banin's sons were martyred later in the battle at Karbala.

It is believed that Umm al-Banin died in 69 A.H. (688/689) or 13 Jumada al-Thani 64 A.H. (6 February 684). She was buried in Jannat al-Baqi, a cemetery in Medina.

Children 
Umm al-Banin had four sons who are as follows:

Abbas ibn Ali
Abdullah ibn Ali
Ja'far ibn Ali 
Imran ibn Ali
descendants from Umm al-Banin are known as Qutb Shahi Awan in Pakistan.

See also 
 Fatima
 Bibi Pak Daman
 Ashura
 Tasu'a
 Ziyarat Ashura
 Shia view of Ali
 Sermon of Ali ibn Husayn in Damascus

References 

Women companions of the Prophet
Year of birth missing
683 deaths
Banu Kilab
Ali
Wives of Shiite Imams
Burials at Jannat al-Baqī